Sergio Raúl Navarro Rodríguez (born February 20, 1936 in Santiago, Chile) is a Chilean former football player and manager who played as a left-back.

Career
He has played for Universidad de Chile (1955–1964), Colo-Colo (1965–1967) and Unión Española (1967–1968), and appeared for the Chile national team in the 1962 FIFA World Cup, held in Chile.

Personal life
He is the father of Carlos Navarro Poblete, a fitness coach and sports author who has worked for several football clubs such as Universidad de Chile and Colo-Colo.

Honours
Universidad de Chile
Primera División (3): 1959, 1962, 1964

References

External links
 Profile at FIFA.com
 

1936 births
Living people
Footballers from Santiago
Chilean footballers
Association football fullbacks
Chile international footballers
Universidad de Chile footballers
Colo-Colo footballers
Unión Española footballers
Chilean Primera División players
Chilean football managers
Unión Española managers
San Luis de Quillota managers
Magallanes managers
Colo-Colo managers
Deportes Naval managers
Curicó Unido managers
Deportes Iberia managers
Deportes Puerto Montt managers
Deportes Antofagasta managers
Chilean Primera División managers
Primera B de Chile managers
1962 FIFA World Cup players